The Southern Heritage Classic presented by FedEx is an annual historically black college football game between the Golden Lions of University of Arkansas at Pine Bluff (UAPB) and the Tigers of Tennessee State University. UAPB replaced the Jackson State University Tigers after Jackson State played 29 games in the classic. The game is broadcast on FOX Sports Southeast.

Location
The game is held at Simmons Bank Liberty Stadium in Memphis.

Annual attendance
The record for attendance, 61,171, was set in 1997. Since the Jackson State-Tennessee State rivalry became a fixture in 1994, the average attendance for a Southern Heritage Classic game is about 50,000. Both schools are roughly equidistant from Memphis, being located approximately 200 miles away. The 2001 game was moved from its originally scheduled date of September 15 to November 22 due to the events of the September 11 terrorist attacks, and attendance suffered as a result, drawing only 28,690.

History
Although the two teams played each other, the games were played at each team's home field on an alternating basis. That made it difficult for fans of the road team to travel en masse. TSU head coach Bill Thomas and JSU head coach W. C. Gorden discussed the possibility of playing annually at a neutral site in Memphis, which was roughly equidistant from both campuses. Doing so benefited both schools by enhancing the rivalry and bringing in more dollars. Both schools have a large alumni base in the Memphis metro area.

The Southern Heritage Classic was founded and has been produced by Fred Jones Jr. A Memphis entrepreneur and entertainment producer, Jones was tasked with organizing the game as officials from both schools weren't familiar enough with the Memphis area.

The Classic part of the series between the two schools began in 1990, with Tennessee State winning 23–14. There were two years in which Jackson State did not participate — 1991 and 1993. Mississippi Valley State played Tennessee State in 1991, and Grambling State was TSU's foe in 1993. Tennessee State has played in every Southern Heritage Classic since the game's inception in 1990, and TSU owns a 19–11 record in the contest.

The games have largely been close, hard-fought battles with three overtime games and 14 contests decided by a touchdown or less. The record for the highest-scoring game was set in 2001, the game delayed by the 9/11 terrorist attacks, when Tennessee State beat Jackson State, 64–33, for a combined 97 points. TSU quarterback Shannon Harris passed for 360 yards and a Southern Heritage Classic record seven touchdowns in that game. Between 1995 and 2007 (13 games), nine were decided by seven points or less. 

Nearly 50 players who participated in the Southern Heritage Classic have gone on to play in the NFL, including four first-round draft picks: Lester Holmes (JSU offensive lineman, drafted 19th by the Philadelphia Eagles in 1993), Sylvester Morris (JSU wide receiver, drafted 21st by the Kansas City Chiefs in 2000), Rashard Anderson (JSU defensive back, drafted 23rd by the Carolina Panthers in 2000) and Dominique Rodgers-Cromartie (TSU defensive back, drafted 18th by the Arizona Cardinals in 2008).

The classic and several festivities affiliated with it annually generated approximately $21 million for the Memphis economy and $325,000 for each university. The game also featured two of the most highly acclaimed show bands in the country, with JSU's Sonic Boom of the South and TSU's Aristocrat of Bands. They both gave high-energy halftime performances that were nearly as popular as the game itself. Also, the Southern Heritage Classic tailgating experience was a large draw and begins days before the game. Concerts and other events fill up the weekend calendar, drawing fans from all over the country. Past concerts have included headline stars such as Luther Vandross, The O'Jays, Gap Band, Gladys Knight and Usher.

The 2020 game, scheduled for September 12, was canceled due to the COVID-19 pandemic.

On February 2, 2022, Jackson State announced that the school would immediately leave the series due to conference conflicts. Tennessee State’s president issued a scathing response stating the decision to terminate the series was “an insensitive and irresponsible act" with consequences that go beyond football. On February 11, 2022, Jackson State announced they will play in the 2022 Southern Heritage Classic for the last time.

On December 7, 2022, it was announced the University of Arkansas at Pine Bluff Golden Lions will replace the Jackson State University Tigers in the classic for 2023 and 2024.

Game results

See also
Aristocrat of Bands
List of black college football classics

References

External links
 

Jackson State Tigers football
Tennessee State Tigers football
Sports in Memphis, Tennessee
Black college football classics